The 2003 Moscow mayoral election took place on December 7 2003, simultaneously with elections to the State Duma.

Candidates
Yury Luzhkov – Mayor of Moscow. Participated in the elections as the independent candidate. Simultaneously, participated in the elections to the State Duma on the party list of United Russia.
Alexander Lebedev – The President of "National Reserve Bank". Participated in the elections as the independent candidate. Simultaneously, participated in the elections to the State Duma on the party list of Rodina.
German Sterligov – Multimillionaire. Participated in the elections as the independent candidate.
Nikolay Lifanov – General Director of "Progress Association". Participated in the elections as the independent candidate.

Withdrew
Alexander Krasnov – Head of the Presnensky District of Moscow.
Aleksey Mitrofanov – Member of the State Duma. Was nominated by the Liberal Democratic Party. But withdrew his candidacy in connection with the fact that he decided to run only in the State Duma.
Igor Smykov – Lawyer and human rights activist. Independent candidate. Withdrew his candidacy in favor of Yury Luzhkov.

Result

References

Mayoral elections in Moscow
2003 in Moscow
2003 elections in Russia
December 2003 events in Russia